Emilie Edet (born 9 March 1946) is a Nigerian sprinter. She competed in the women's 100 metres at the 1972 Summer Olympics.

References

1946 births
Living people
Athletes (track and field) at the 1972 Summer Olympics
Nigerian female sprinters
Nigerian female hurdlers
Olympic athletes of Nigeria
Athletes (track and field) at the 1970 British Commonwealth Games
Commonwealth Games competitors for Nigeria
Place of birth missing (living people)
20th-century Nigerian women